East Sister Island or Takoa-te is a small uninhabited island in the Andaman Archipelago, at the northern side of the Duncan Passage, about 6 km southeast of Passage Island and 18 km north of North Brother.

The island is roughly rectangular, around 750 m long in the NE-SW direction and 550 m wide, and is mostly covered by forest; it has a beach on the NW side and a rocky shore on the three other sides. Its highest point is 76 m above sea level.

East Sister and the smaller West Sister, located about 250 m to the southwest, comprise the group called The Sisters.  It belongs to the Andaman and Nicobar Islands Territory of India.

References

Islands of the Andaman and Nicobar Islands
Uninhabited islands of India
Islands of India
Islands of the Bay of Bengal